The Navia is an electric 10-passenger robo-driven vehicle made by France's Induct Technology. It operates at a maximum speed of 20 km/h (12.5 mph), using four lidar ("LIght raDAR") units, along with stereoscopic optical cameras, to generate a real-time 3D map of its surroundings. It does not require rails, overhead lines or other road changes.

It is being tested at campuses in Switzerland, the United Kingdom and Singapore.

Applications
Plans call for it to transport passengers between Singapore’s Nanyang Technological University (NTU) and JTC Corporation's CleanTech Park over a  2-km (1.2-mile) route. Passengers select their destination stop on a touchscreen display.

References

External links
 

Battery electric buses
Unmanned ground vehicles